Lawrence Scarpa (born October 28, 1959) is an American architect based in Los Angeles, California. He used conventional materials in unexpected ways and is considered a pioneer and leader in the field of sustainable design.

Personal life
Scarpa was born into a Jewish-Italian family in Queens, New York. After his mother's death from cancer in 1967, the family moved to Miami, Florida. As a child, Scarpa became interested in architecture while helping his father after school with small construction projects that his father undertook to supplement his regular income as a mailman. While on job sites with his father, Scarpa would often build little buildings made from construction debris and other small scraps of wood found there. This interest in making and construction has followed Scarpa his entire life.  He is married to American architect Angela Brooks.

Career
In 1976, Scarpa's father moved the family to Winter Haven, Florida where he opened a restaurant. While working in the restaurant as a senior in high school, Scarpa befriended a regular customer named Gene Leedy, an architect and member of the Sarasota School of Architecture. Leedy soon became Scarpa's mentor. Scarpa worked for Leedy and in his father's restaurant while attending the University of Florida. Upon graduation from the university, Scarpa moved to Boca Grande, Florida to work for Leedy as the foreman for the construction of houses designed by Leedy. Scarpa then accepted a job and moved to New York to work for Paul Rudolph for nearly two years until he returned to Graduate School at the University of Florida in 1984. Upon graduation from the University of Florida, he moved to Vicenza, Italy for two years before returning to the United States to teach at the University of Florida where he met his future wife, Angela Brooks, whom he married in 1987. The couple moved to San Francisco and one year later relocated to Los Angeles, where they live with their one son. In 1991, after three years of working together with architect and engineer Gwynne Pugh, the two men formed the architecture firm Pugh + Scarpa. In 2011, the firm name changed its name to Brooks + Scarpa to reflect the firm's leadership under Brooks and Scarpa.

Notable career achievements

Honors and awards
Early in his career, Scarpa completed many National AIA award winning office projects.

In 2004, the Architectural League of New York selected Scarpa as an "Emerging Voice" in architecture. His work has been exhibited at the National Building Museum in Washington, DC, MOCA and at numerous other venues worldwide. He was featured in Newsweek and in a segment on The Oprah Winfrey Show. In 2009, Interior Design Magazine honored him with their Lifetime Achievement Award. In 2010, his firm Pugh + Scarpa received the American Institute of Architects Firm Award, the highest award given to an architectural firm. He was also elected to the American Institute of Architects College of Fellows in 2010. In 2014 Brooks + Scarpa were the recipients of the Smithsonian Cooper-Hewitt National Design Museum Award in Architecture. In 2015, Scarpa received the American Institute of Architects California Council (AIACC) Lifetime Achievement Award. In 2018 he received the National American Institute of Architects Collaborative Achievement Award and the Gold Medal in Architecture from the American Institute of Architects Los Angeles Chapter. He is the recipients of the 2022 American Institute of Architects Gold Medal. As the institutes highest award, the Gold Medal honors an individual or pair whose significant body of work has had a lasting influence on the theory and practice of architecture.

Sustainability
Scarpa's project Colorado Court in Santa Monica was the first multi-family housing project in the USA to be LEED Certified.  His Solar umbrella house in Venice, California has been named by the American Institute of Architects (AIA) as one of their Top Ten Green Projects. Both Colorado Court and the Solar Umbrella House and Step Up on 5th are the only projects in the history of the American Institute of Architects (AIA) to win a National AIA Design Award, an AIA "COTE" Committee on the Environment "Top Ten Green Building" Award and a National AIA special interest award for a single project.

Academia
Scarpa has held teaching positions at several universities for more than two decades and is currently on the faculty at the University of Southern California. In 2020, he was the William F. Stern Endowed Visiting Professor at the Gerald D. Hines College of Architecture and Design, University of Houston, the Paul Helmle Fellow at California Polytechnic University and the Regnier Visiting Professor at Kansas State University. He was the 2014 Barber McMurry Professor at the University of Tennessee.  He was the 2012 visiting professor at Harvard University Graduate School of Design, and in 2011 was the John Jerde Distinguished Professor at The University of Southern California.  He was also the 2009 E. Fay Jones Distinguished Chair in Architecture at the University of Arkansas, the 2008 Ruth and James Moore Visiting Professor at Washington University in St. Louis, the 2007 Eliel Saarinen Distinguished Professor in Architecture at the Alfred Taubman College of Architecture + Urban Planning, University of Michigan Ann Arbor, the 2004 Howard Friedman Fellow in Architecture at the University of California Berkeley. He has also taught at the University of California Los Angeles, Southern California Institute of Architecture, University of Florida as well as several other higher education institutions.

References

External links

 Lawrence Scarpa Official Bio

1959 births
Living people
20th-century American architects
21st-century American architects
American people of Italian descent
American people of Jewish descent
Modernist architects
University of Florida alumni
University of Florida faculty
University of Southern California faculty
University of Houston faculty
Kansas State University faculty
University of Tennessee faculty
Washington University in St. Louis faculty
University of Michigan faculty